The High Commissioner for Palestine was the highest ranking authority representing the United Kingdom in the mandated territories of Palestine and the High Commissioner for Transjordan was the highest ranking authority representing the United Kingdom in Transjordan. These posts were always held simultaneously by a single individual after the High Commissioner for Transjordan was established in 1928.

The British representative to Amman was "responsible to the high commissioner in his role as representative of the mandatory power, but not in his capacity as head of the Palestine administration."

They were based in Jerusalem. The office commenced on 1 July 1920, before the commencement of the Mandate on 29 September 1923, and replaced the British military occupation under the Occupied Enemy Territory Administration, which had operated in Palestine in 1917–1918. The office ceased with the expiration of the Mandate on 15 May 1948.

When the office of High Commissioner was vacant, or the High Commissioner was unable to perform his duties for some reason, a person who was usually the Chief Secretary of the Government of Palestine was appointed to perform the same duties with the same powers.

List of High Commissioners for Palestine and High Commissioners for Trans-Jordan

See also
British Mandate of Palestine

References

External links
 Report to the League of Nations on the Administration of Palestine and Trans-Jordan for the year 1928
 World Statesmen - Israel
 Agreement between his Britannic Majesty and His Highness the Amir of Trans-Jordan, February 1928 Article 1, "His Highness the Amir agrees that His Britannic Majesty shall be represented in Trans-Jordan by a British Resident acting on behalf of the High Commissioner for Trans-Jordan."
Herbert Samuel and the British Mandate for Palestine: the Formative Years on the Israel State Archives website

Mandatory Palestine
 
Palestine
Palestine and Transjordan
Emirate of Transjordan
British expatriates in Mandatory Palestine